Sir Thomas Head (1714–1779) was High Sheriff of Berkshire.

Biography
Thomas was born in 1714, the son of Richard Head of Bucklebury in West Berkshire. He was educated at John Roysse's Free School in Abingdon, (now Abingdon School) (1730–1735) and later Corpus Christi College, Oxford B.A (1735–1738).

In 1744, Thomas was knighted and was appointed High Sheriff of Berkshire. He married Jane Holt of Redgrave Hall, Suffolk in 1750 and they lived together at Langley Hall in Hampstead Norreys.

His son, Sir Walter James James (formerly Walter Head) (1759–1829), became the first baronet of Langley Hall.

See also
 List of Old Abingdonians

References

1714 births
1779 deaths
High Sheriffs of Berkshire
People educated at Abingdon School
Alumni of Corpus Christi College, Oxford
People from Bucklebury
People from West Berkshire District